Francesc Trabal (Sabadell, 1899 - Santiago de Chile, 1957) was a Catalan novelist, journalist and humorist.

He was one of the founders of the Colla de Sabadell (the Sabadell gang), where they started La Mirada publishing house. They promoted catalan culture, literature and humour using the newspaper El Diari de Sabadell as a platform. He was one of the founders of the El Club dels Novel·listes (Novelists Club), predecessor of today's Institució de les Lletres Catalanes. He went into exile in Chile during the Spanish Civil War, where he created continued promoting Catalan culture. He started a Chilean-Catalan Institute for Culture, along with different publishing initiatives.

Works 
 L'any que ve (1925)
 L'home que es va perdre (1929). Translated to French by Marie-Jose Castaing and to Spanish by Javier Cercas.
 Judita (1930). Translated to Spanish by Manuel Salvat (1941), Montserrat Planas & Marta Pessarrodona (1972); and to French by Montserrat Prudon (1994)
 Quo vadis, Sànchez? with drawings by Valentí Castanys (1931)
 Era una dona com les altres (1932)
 Hi ha homes que ploren perquè el sol es pon (1933)
 Vals (1935), Translated to Spanish by Joan Oliver (1945) and to English by Martha Tennent (2013)
 Temperatura (1947). Translated  to Spanish by himself (1947)

References 

 

Writers from Catalonia
People from Sabadell